Shanti Devi was an Indian politician from the state of Odisha who served as Member of Odisha Legislative Assembly, Queen of Dharakote and Deputy Chairperson of Ganjam Municipal Corporation. In 1990 Odisha Legislative Assembly election, she got 45,201 votes.

Personal life 
She died on 4 June 2009. She married Ananta Narayan Singh Deo in April 1960. She was the mother of Kishore Chandra Singh Deo and mother-in-law of Nandini Devi.

References 

Odisha MLAs 1990–1995
Women members of the Odisha Legislative Assembly
2009 deaths
Date of birth missing
Janata Dal politicians